Stéphanie Rizzi (born 23 August 1981) is a French former professional tennis player.

A right-handed player from Grenoble, Rizzi spent her career on the ITF Circuit and reached a best ranking of 257 in the world. She won two ITF singles titles, including the $25k Les Contamines tournament in 2002.

Rizzi competed in the qualifying draw of the French Open on four occasions, without making it through to the main draw.

ITF Circuit finals

Singles: 6 (2–4)

Doubles: 4 (2–2)

References

External links
 
 

1981 births
Living people
French female tennis players
Sportspeople from Grenoble